Friedburginsel (Friedburg Island) is the partly ice-free island 1.66 km long in southwest–northeast direction and 653 m wide in the Vedel Islands group of Wilhelm Archipelago in the Antarctic Peninsula region. Its surface area is 51.14 ha.

First published by August Petermann in 1875. Discovered by the German Antarctic Expedition 1873-74 under Eduard Dallmann.

Location
British mapping in 2001.

Maps
 British Admiralty Nautical Chart 446 Anvers Island to Renaud Island. Scale 1:150000. Admiralty, UK Hydrographic Office, 2001
 Brabant Island to Argentine Islands. Scale 1:250000 topographic map. British Antarctic Survey, 2008
 Antarctic Digital Database (ADD). Scale 1:250000 topographic map of Antarctica. Scientific Committee on Antarctic Research (SCAR). Since 1993, regularly upgraded and updated

See also
 List of Antarctic and subantarctic islands

Notes

References
 Friedburginsel. SCAR Composite Antarctic Gazetteer

External links
 Friedburginsel. Adjusted Copernix satellite image

Islands of the Wilhelm Archipelago